Pattiyal is a 2006 Indian Tamil-language crime thriller film written and directed by Vishnuvardhan and produced by Punnagai Poo Gheetha. It stars Bharath, Arya, Pooja Umashankar, and Padmapriya Janakiraman while Cochin Haneefa and Santhana Bharathi play pivotal roles. The film tackles the issue of dons and was based on the 1999 Thai film Bangkok Dangerous.

The film's score and soundtrack are composed by Yuvan Shankar Raja with cinematography by Nirav Shah and editing by A. Sreekar Prasad. It released on 17 March 2006 and became a commercial success.

Plot

Kosi and Selva, are contract killers working for a middleman with the ironic name of Sami. Director Vishnuvardan portrays this morbid telling of two orphaned youths with incredible realism of trust, friendship, and ultimate betrayal masterfully. Kosi is an unblinking man with a stubborn feel for life, thereby refusing to love and be loved. Selva, deaf and dumb, is equally intrepid, although he has a heart ticking beneath the dark, dire exterior.

Saroja, a salesgirl at a garment company, is an outgoing, sprightly girl and a friend of both Kosi and Selva. She is in deeply in love with Kosi, but the latter only finds her presence as a nuisance, whereas Saroja's chief manager stubbornly tries to make Saroja sleep with him. In stark contrast to this romance is the love between Selva and Sandhya, who are smitten with each other after some fate-based encounters that bring some lighthearted humor to the film. As the film progresses, Kosi and Saroja end up sleeping together when Kosi begins to drink excessively, promptly making him start to realize his feelings for Saroja. Unfortunately, this newfound happiness does not last as their profession does not allow it to.

Kosi and Selva set out to assassinate Avinashi Nachimuthu Gounder, a business tycoon and uprising politician, as instructed to do so by Sami. Kosi and Selva mutually agree to make this assignment their last, and to begin leading normal lives with their newfound loves Saroja and Sandhya respectively. A new twist occurs in the story where the people who hired Saami told him to finish off Kosi and Selva once the job is completed.

Upon preparing for the assassination, Kosi becomes unable to think as he finds himself overwhelmed with feelings of love, at which point Selva decides that he should finish the execution himself and Kosi should go speak with Saroja. Kosi visits Saroja at her home where he finds her shivering and with bruises. Saroja then tells Kosi how her chief manager intruded the house and sexually violated her after she refused to love him. Infuriated at this, an emotionally shaken Kosi finds the manager and beats him to a horrific death. Meanwhile, Selva had cunningly assassinated Gounder and is returning home. The manager's boss, who happens to be a big don himself, finds out Kosi is the one responsible for the manager's death and seeks out revenge. He gets hold of Saami and blackmails him to bring Kosi to him for his life. Unknowingly, Kosi goes with Saami and is killed in the ambush from a gunshot to his head.

Selva, who returns later, finds out about this unfortunate event and seeks revenge. He visits Sandhya and questions her about Kosi's murder and the people responsible for his death. He intrudes the don's house and kills everyone in his way, including the don. When Selva returned home, Sandhya was shocked to see him with many injuries. She tells him to wait by the door while she went to call for an auto rickshaw to get them both to the hospital. Meanwhile, the irritating boy who appeared before begging for a job stabs Selva in the same approach as Selva did in the introduction scene in the hotel room. The boy who was still recovering for the shock that he actually stabbed Selva stabbed him again multiple times when he saw Sandhya rushing towards him. Selva dies from multiple wounds and falls on Sandhya's lap.

In the scene before the credits, a scene is shown where Saami is having a chat with the boy who committed the murder. The scene is shown as a deja-vu where Saami convinces Kosi and Selva that they are all part of this scheme together. Saami uses the same dialogue to the boy, letting the audience connect that the boy will be killed too.

Cast

 Bharath as Selva
 Arya as Kosi
 Pooja as Sandhya
 Padmapriya Janakiraman as Saroja
 Cochin Haneefa as Saamy
 Santhana Bharathi as Avinashi Nachimuthu Gounder
 Gowtham Sundararajan as Azhagu
 Krishna as Krishna
 Vatsala Rajagopal as Sandhya's grandmother
 Aarthi as Aarthi
 Dileepan as Sappa
 Mohan Natrajan
 Punnagai Poo Gheetha (cameo appearance)

Music

The soundtrack was composed by Vishnuvardhan's friend and "usual composer" Yuvan Shankar Raja and released on 28 February 2006. It features 6 tracks overall with lyrics by Pa. Vijay. The soundtrack proved very popular upon release and was cited as a "truly rocking" album. Further more, Yuvan Shankar Raja was awarded his first Tamil Nadu State Film Award for Best Music Director for the musical score in 2006.

Box office
The film was a commercial success grossing 11 crore at the box office.
 The film was shot in Chennai, India and Race Course area of Coimbatore, India

References

External links
 

2006 films
Indian gangster films
Films directed by Vishnuvardhan (director)
Films scored by Yuvan Shankar Raja
2000s Tamil-language films
Indian remakes of Thai films